Intersection assistant is an advanced driver assistance system first introduced in 2009.

City junctions are a major accident blackspot. The collisions here can mostly be put down to driver distraction or misjudgement. Whereas humans often react too slowly, assistance systems are immune to that brief moment of shock.

The system monitors cross traffic in an intersection/road junction. If this anticipatory system detects a hazardous situation of this type, it prompts the driver to start emergency braking by activating visual and acoustic warnings and automatically engaging brakes.

Vehicles 

Toyota Crown Majesta (from 2009 onwards)  Front-side Pre-crash Safety System
Mercedes-Benz S-Class (W222), Mercedes-Benz E-Class (W212) (from 2013 onwards): BAS PLUS with Cross-Traffic Assist.

References

Vehicle safety technologies
Warning systems
Advanced driver assistance systems